Andreas Schiener (born 30 November 1974) is a retired Austrian football midfielder.

Honours

 Austrian Football Bundesliga winner: 2000–01, 2001–02
 Austrian Regionalliga Ost winner: 2009–10

External links
 

1974 births
Living people
Austrian footballers
FC Admira Wacker Mödling players
FC Tirol Innsbruck players
FK Austria Wien players
WSG Tirol players
LASK players
FC Waidhofen/Ybbs players
People from Mödling
Association football midfielders
Austrian Regionalliga players
Footballers from Lower Austria